Carpender is a surname. It is an English phonetic variant of the surname Carpenter. It is sometimes seen as Carpendar. Notable people with the surname include:

Arthur S. Carpender, American Vice Admiral of World War II, served in World War I
Dave Carpender, guitarist with The Greg Kihn Band
Edward Weston Carpender (ca. 1796 – 1877), United States Navy officer who served in three wars
Henry de la Bruyere Carpender and William Carpender Stevens, suspects in the Hall–Mills murder case
Tom Carpender, former bass player with The Rubinoos

See also
 Carpenders Park
 Carpenders Park railway station

English-language surnames
Occupational surnames
English-language occupational surnames